Ikot Etakpo is a village in Etinan local government area of Akwa Ibom State of Nigeria.

References 

Villages in Akwa Ibom